In mathematics, a Lefschetz manifold is a particular kind of symplectic manifold , sharing a certain cohomological property with Kähler manifolds, that of satisfying the conclusion of the Hard Lefschetz theorem.

be an isomorphism. 

The topology of these symplectic manifolds is severely constrained, for example their odd Betti numbers are even. This remark leads to numerous examples of symplectic manifolds which are not Kähler, the first historical example is due to William Thurston.

Lefschetz maps
Let  be a -dimensional smooth manifold. Each element

of the second de Rham cohomology space of  induces a map 

The Hard Lefschetz theorem states that this is the case for the symplectic form of a compact Kähler manifold.

Definitions

If 

and 

are isomorphisms, then  is a Lefschetz element, or Lefschetz class. If 

is an isomorphism for all , then  is a strong Lefschetz element, or a strong Lefschetz class.

Let  be a -dimensional symplectic manifold. Then it is orientable, but maybe not compact.

Where to find Lefschetz manifolds

The real manifold underlying any Kähler manifold is a symplectic manifold. The strong Lefschetz theorem tells us that it is also a strong Lefschetz manifold, and hence a Lefschetz manifold. Therefore we have the following chain of inclusions.

{Kähler manifolds}  {strong Lefschetz manifolds} {Lefschetz manifolds}  {symplectic manifolds}

Chal Benson and Carolyn S. Gordon proved in 1988 that if a compact nilmanifold is a Lefschetz manifold, then it is diffeomorphic to a torus.  The fact that there are nilmanifolds that are not diffeomorphic to a torus shows that there is some space between Kähler manifolds and symplectic manifolds, but the class of nilmanifolds fails to show any differences between Kähler manifolds, Lefschetz manifolds, and strong Lefschetz manifolds.

Gordan and Benson conjectured that if a compact complete solvmanifold admits a Kähler structure, then it is diffeomorphic to a torus. This has been proved. Furthermore, many examples have been found of solvmanifolds that are strong Lefschetz but not Kähler, and solvmanifolds that are Lefschetz but not strong Lefschetz. Such examples were given by Takumi Yamada in 2002.

Notes

Symplectic geometry